Intercourse is the second (and to date last) studio album by English dance music act S'Express. For this release, S'Express was basically Mark Moore and Sonique with a variety of guest vocalists and musicians. It was originally released in the US in 1991 with a UK / European release following shortly afterwards.

The track listing varied considerably between the two territories but with neither release enjoying chart success. Four singles were released from the album over a period of three years, the earliest of which - "Mantra for a State of Mind" was the biggest hit, reaching #21 on the UK Singles Chart.

Critical reception
Dave Obee from Calgary Herald wrote, "Formerly a sextet - really - S`Express is down to the duo of Mark Moore and a singer named Sonique - again, really. Moore is, allegedly, the brains behind the band, but Sonique is the real story. Her sultry, soaring voice - reminiscent almost of Boy George's - can handle a wide variety of material, all based on a dance beat. When she`s not singing, the disc offers solid dance music with occasional flashes of brilliance. When she is, the clouds part and the sun shines through. And soon, she`ll have us all dancing to "Twinkle, Twinkle, Little Star". Yes, really."

Track listing

US CD (9 26520-2) 
"Nothing to Lose" - 6:45 *
"Trumpets" - 6:52
"Find 'Em, Fool 'Em, Forget 'Em" - 4:48
"Twinkle (Step into My Mind)" - 5:45
"Nervous Motion" - 6:35
"Find Time to Be Yourself" - 4:03
"What Does it Take?" - 6:03
"Supersonic Lover" - 5:20
"Brazil" - 4:29
"Mantra for a State of Mind" (Club Vocal) - 8:47
"Twinkle (Step into My Mind)" (Psychotronic Mix) - 7:03
"Nervous Motion" (Gurls Mix) - 6:35

* A second US pressing replaced this version with the 2:54 Single Mix (taken from the US 9 track CD single) of 'Nothing To Lose'. The album catalogue numbers are identical although the CD matrix numbers differ - 1 26520-2 RE-1 SRC+01 for the 2:54 Single Mix and 1 26520-2 SRC=02 for the regular 6:45 version.

UK LP & CD (468567 1/2) 
"Nothing to Lose" - 6:45
"Trumpets" - 6:52
"Find 'Em, Fool 'Em, Forget 'Em" (Wondere(s)que Mix) - 3:32
"Twinkle (Step into My Mind)" (Psychotronic Mix) - 7:03
"Nervous Motion" - 6:05
"Find Time to Be Yourself" - 4:03
"I Like It" - 6:41
"Supersonic Lover" - 4:33
"Brazil" - 4:29
"Mantra for a State of Mind" (Club Mix) - 8:47 *
"Find 'Em, Fool 'Em, Forget 'Em" (The Eighth Out Mix) - 7:47 *

* CD bonus tracks. The booklet lists the timings for these tracks in the wrong order.

Notes
The UK and US regular versions of "Nervous Motion" are, although not identified as such, different mixes.
"Supersonic Lover" is edited for the UK release.
The 'Club Mix' and 'Club Vocal' versions of "Mantra for a State of Mind" are identical.

References

External links
 S'Express and Intercourse article

1991 albums
S'Express albums